Lê Bả Thành (born October 12, 1934) was an Olympic judoka for the Republic of South Vietnam. He competed in the middleweight division. In that particular olympics he would lose to PHi-Tae Kim and Chin-Chun Huang.  He was listed in Black Belt Magazine as a participant within the 1964 Olympic games.

References

1934 births
Living people
Olympic judoka of Vietnam
Judoka at the 1964 Summer Olympics
Vietnamese male judoka